KLAS-TV (channel 8) is a television station in Las Vegas, Nevada, United States, affiliated with CBS and owned by Nexstar Media Group. The station's studios are located on Channel 8 Drive near the northern portion of the Las Vegas Strip in the unincorporated community of Winchester (though with a Las Vegas mailing address), and its transmitter is located on Mount Arden in Henderson.

History

Early years
KLAS-TV initially broadcast a test pattern for two weeks, beginning on July 8, 1953. The station went on-air on the evening of July 22, 1953, becoming Nevada's first television station. The station was originally owned by Las Vegas Television Inc., run by Hank Greenspun, owner of the Las Vegas Sun. KLAS has always been a CBS affiliate, but maintained a secondary affiliation with ABC, which it would share with KLRJ/KORK-TV (channel 3, now KSNV-DT) from that station's sign on in January 1955, until KSHO-TV (channel 13, now KTNV-TV) debuted in May 1956. Billionaire and aviation magnate Howard Hughes enjoyed staying up late and watching television, and he wanted KLAS to broadcast all night for him to watch. Hughes also requested the station to play more films about airplanes and cowboys. He eventually decided to purchase the station so he could have it operate as he wanted. Greenspun sold the station to Hughes Tool Company on March 30, 1968. After Hughes' death in 1976, the station was held in an outside trust for another two years until 1978, when it was sold to Landmark Communications (Landmark Communications renamed itself to Landmark Media Enterprises in September 2008).

Since 1996
On April 16, 1996, KLAS-TV became the first commercial television station in Nevada (and one of the first in the United States) to carry a digital broadcast signal. This signal was first launched during the National Association of Broadcasters annual convention that year. On April 6, 2000, the first scheduled high definition network broadcasts in Las Vegas began on KLAS-TV's digital signal.

On January 30, 2008, Landmark announced its intention to sell KLAS, along with its other television station WTVF in Nashville. No suitable buyer for KLAS was found until Landmark took most of its properties off the market in October 2008 due to the economic recession. KLAS and WTVF remained under Landmark ownership for more than four years.

On September 4, 2012, Journal Broadcast Group (owners of one of KLAS-TV's local rivals, ABC affiliate KTNV-TV) announced that it would purchase WTVF for $215 million. The sale was finalized on December 6. This left KLAS-TV as the only television station in Landmark's portfolio.

On November 21, 2014, Nexstar Broadcasting Group announced that it would purchase KLAS for $145 million. The sale was completed on February 13, 2015.

On January 29, 2016, shortly prior to Super Bowl 50, KLAS was dropped from Cox Communications due to a retransmission consent dispute with Nexstar across nine markets. As a contingency plan, Cox announced on February 3, 2016, that it would offer a free preview of ESPN Deportes (which was broadcasting the game in Spanish) over the Super Bowl weekend, and encouraged viewers to listen to the English radio broadcast along with it. The next day, KLAS was restored after Cox reached a new deal with Nexstar.

Programming
Syndicated programming seen on KLAS-TV includes Live with Kelly and Ryan, Jeopardy!, Wheel of Fortune, and Dr. Phil; the latter three shows are distributed by CBS Media Ventures. The station clears the entire CBS network schedule, though Let's Make a Deal leads out of The Bold and the Beautiful after the noon news and into The Talk, which is unusual scheduling for CBS' daytime programming, allowing Dr. Phil to be led into by The Talk.

In 2020, Nexstar and KLAS were named the official television partners of the NFL's Las Vegas Raiders. Along with carrying the bulk of the team's games as part of the NFL on CBS, KLAS carries preseason games and team-produced ancillary programming (such as The Silver & Black Show). By virtue of CBS holding the rights to the game, KLAS will be the local broadcaster of Super Bowl LVIII at Allegiant Stadium.

News operation

KLAS-TV presently broadcasts 38 hours of locally produced newscasts each week (with 6½ hours each weekday, two hours on Saturdays and 3½ hours on Sundays); in addition, the station formerly produced an additional five hours of local newscasts for its second subchannel (with one hour each weekday). Although channel 8 does not produce a Saturday edition of its morning newscast, 8 News Now: Good Day, the station does produce a newscast which airs for 3 hours weekday mornings from 4 to 7 a.m. and on Sunday mornings for an hour at 5:30 a.m. and a half-hour at 8 a.m., since channel 8 airs CBS Saturday Morning. The evening news runs at 5 p.m., 6 p.m. and 11 p.m. and is anchored by Denise Valdez, Paul Joncich and Christianne Klein.

KLAS previously branded its newscasts as Eyewitness News, taking over the name from 1982 after KVBC discontinued using the branding, and used it until late 2009, when its newscasts adopted the 8 News Now title. In the early 1980s, the station's newscasts were branded as Newscenter 8, and used the opening Phenix Horns music of Earth, Wind & Fire's 1979 single "In the Stone" for two years. On September 21, 1981, KLAS-TV became the first station in the state of Nevada to provide hour-long newscasts. For years, KLAS produced a daily interview show, which aired on sister channel Las Vegas One; the program moved to NBC affiliate KVBC (channel 3, now KSNV) in January 2010.

Beginning in the fall of 2002, KLAS produced a 10 p.m. newscast for KTUD-CA called Eyewitness News at 10 on UPN. In the fall of 2006, when KTUD became an independent station, that station was rebranded on-air as "Vegas TV" and the newscasts was renamed to suit the new identity. Shortly after the merger, however, the station dropped the 10 p.m. newscast. KTUD later revived its 10 p.m. newscast, this time produced by KSNV, from October 2009 to August 2010.

In March 2006, KLAS revamped the station's morning newscast, which was branded as Eyewitness News This Morning at the time.

On September 17, 2006, KLAS became the first station in the Las Vegas market and the state of Nevada, and the eleventh station in the United States, to begin broadcasting its local newscasts in high definition.

Just after Nexstar purchased the station, it was announced that Nexstar might discontinue the 4 a.m. and 4:30 a.m. half-hours of the station's weekday morning newscast. Starting on February 25, 2015, Nexstar would lay off at least 18 of the station's employees, mainly in the news department's business and traffic divisions; some jobs related to the station's Internet operations were also removed as the station's web operations moved onto Nexstar's Lakana platform. The station's news helicopter was also discontinued.

On October 10, 2018, channel 8 began producing an hour-long weeknight 9 p.m. newscast for its second digital subchannel, making it the only television station in Las Vegas to air a local newscast in that timeslot.

Reception
KLAS has won more than 100 awards for its news coverage, including investigative documentaries about the American Mafia and UFOs. In 1986, United Press International awarded it "Best Newscast in America". As of 1992, it frequently dominated ratings in local newscasts. In 2011, KLAS received 19 nominations from the National Academy of Television Arts and Sciences, eclipsing its rival news stations. Channel 8 has been the ratings leader in the Las Vegas market for many years. However, the station did not finish in first place in any timeslot as of the May 2015 sweeps period and dropped to last place in some timeslots. Rivals KTNV, KVVU and KSNV had eroded ratings for KLAS' newscasts.

Notable news staff
Bob Stoldal joined KLAS as a reporter and anchor in 1967, before becoming the network's news director in 1970. Sue Lowden joined KLAS as a reporter in 1978, and later became an anchor. Gary Waddell became an anchor in 1980. Lowden departed the station in 1987, and Paula Francis joined as an anchor the following year. George Knapp has also been a longtime anchor for the station. Polly Gonzalez joined KLAS in 1994, becoming the first prime-time Hispanic anchor in Las Vegas.

In 2002, Stoldal was named as vice president of news, overseeing operations for KLAS while retaining his position as news director. Dave Courvoisier, a former anchor for KVBC, was hired as a KLAS anchor in 2003. Gonzalez worked as a KLAS anchor until her death from an auto accident in 2005. She was widely remembered, and a memorial park was later opened. Gonzalez was replaced by Denise Valdez as anchor.

Stoldal retired in 2008, as he felt the timing was right considering Landmark Communications' intentions to sell KLAS. Dayna Roselli became a fulltime morning anchor in 2008, after joining KLAS four years earlier as a helicopter reporter and also working as a fill-in and traffic anchor. Roselli was considered one of Las Vegas' prominent media figures. She left KLAS in 2012, when the station added two new anchors in an effort to increase morning ratings. The effort ultimately failed to produce a notable change in the ratings, and one of the new anchors, Shauna Khorrami, was fired after eight months.

Waddell retired in 2012, after spending 32 years with KLAS. Waddell had become the longest-serving news anchor in Las Vegas. Francis left KLAS in 2016 to retire as well, and was replaced by Valdez. Courvoisier retired in 2017. He had anchored news in the Las Vegas market for 27 years. But he came out of retirement to return as a morning anchor at KTNV-TV starting in August 2020. Tedd Florendo and Sherry Swensk are the channel's weather presenters.

Technical information

Subchannels
The station's digital signal is multiplexed:

In 2010, KLAS launched a second subchannel affiliated with MeTV. As of June 2013, the station launched another subchannel, this time with Movies!. Ion Television began airing on 8.4 in 2017 and was replaced by Circle in April 2021 and Rewind TV on November 1, 2021. In January 2022, Movies! was replaced by SportsGrid. On June 1 of that year, MeTV moved to KHSV resulting in Rewind TV moved to DT2, and Shop LC took it's place on DT4. In October 2022, SportsGrid was replaced by getTV.

Analog-to-digital conversion
KLAS-TV shut down its analog signal, over VHF channel 8, on June 12, 2009, the official date in which full-power television stations in the United States transitioned from analog to digital broadcasts under federal mandate. The station's digital signal remained on its pre-transition VHF channel 7. Through the use of PSIP, digital television receivers display the station's virtual channel as its former VHF analog channel 8.

Translators

References

External links

CBS network affiliates
Rewind TV affiliates
GetTV affiliates
LAS-TV
Television channels and stations established in 1953
1953 establishments in Nevada
Hughes Television Network
Nexstar Media Group